Narcotoline is an opiate alkaloid chemically related to noscapine.  It binds to the same receptors in the brain as noscapine to act as an antitussive, and has also been used in tissue culture media.

Sources
It can be obtained from the opium poppy, Papaver somniferum.  It is present at much higher levels in culinary strains (cultivars) of P. somniferum used for poppy seed production than in high-morphine pharmaceutical strains used for opium production.

References

External links 
KEGG compound C09593

Benzylisoquinoline alkaloids
Phenols
3-(5,6,7,8-tetrahydro-(1,3)dioxolo(4,5-g)isoquinolin-5-yl)-3H-2-benzofuran-1-ones